Juan Santiago is a Dominican municipality in the Elías Piña province.

History
Juan Santiago was elevated to the category of municipal district of Comendador by the law 916 of 12 August 1978. Then it was elevated to the category of municipality.

Economy
The main economic activity of the municipality is agriculture.

References 

Populated places in Elías Piña Province
Municipalities of the Dominican Republic